Große Kulmke is a river of Lower Saxony, Germany.

The Große Kulmke is a tributary of the Sieber in central Germany. It rises near the natural monument of  Mönchskappenklippe near the ridge of Auf dem Acker, north-northeast of Sieber in the district of Göttingen in Lower Saxony. It then flows mainly in a southerly direction, separated from the Sieber by the Königsberg. The valley of the Große Kulmke is part of the  Sieber Valley (Siebertal) nature reserve.

See also 
List of rivers of Lower Saxony

References

Sources
Topographische Karte 1:25000, No. 4228 Riefensbeek

External links
Sieber Valley Nature Reserve at the website of the Lower Saxon State Department for Waterway, Coastal and Nature Conservation (NLWKN) 

Rivers of Lower Saxony
Rivers of the Harz
Göttingen (district)
Rivers of Germany